Schraderanthus is a genus of flowering plants belonging to the family Solanaceae.

Its native range is Mexico to Guatemala.

Species:
 Schraderanthus viscosus (Schrad.) Averett

References

Solanaceae
Solanaceae genera